Hyun-kyung, also spelled Hyun-kyoung or Hyon-gyong, is a Korean feminine given name. Its meaning differs based on the hanja used to write each syllable of the name. There are 35 hanja with the reading "hyun" and 54 hanja with the reading "kyung" on the South Korean government's official list of hanja which may be used in given names.

People with this name include:

Entertainers
Oh Hyun-kyung (born 1970), South Korean actress
Ryu Hyun-kyung (born 1983), South Korean actress
Uhm Hyun-kyung (born 1986), South Korean actress

Sportspeople
Yoon Hyun-kyung (born 1986), South Korean team handball player
Kang Hyun-kyung (born 1995), South Korean track cyclist
Kim Hyon-gyong (born 1995), North Korean wrestler

Other
Bae Hyeon-gyeong, general of the state of Taebong
Chung Hyun Kyung (born 1950s), South Korean Christian theologian
So Hyun-kyung (born 1965), South Korean screenwriter 
Mary H.K. Choi (born Choi Hyun-kyung, 1979), South Korean-born American writer
Hyon Gyon (born Park Hyun-kyoung, 1979), South Korean artist

See also
List of Korean given names

References

Korean feminine given names